Ha'penny Breeze is a 1950 black and white British film. It was the first writing credit for Don Sharp who also appears as an actor.

Plot
David King and his Australian friend Johnny return to a Suffolk coastal village after the Second World War to find the community completely dispirited. 

His mother had told him that his father had died during his absence, but not that the family boat-building business had closed. His dad was also the mayor, but no-one has been elected in his place.

They have little luck encouraging the locals to rejoin them in the boatyard, but set about a project of converting one of their old boats into a pleasure yacht. However, this does little to encourage the old workers as they yachts as "parasite" crafts in relation to the fishing vessels formerly made. Nevertheless, they determine to enter the as yet unfinished yacht, Allana, into a race. Only when they see her in sail to they start to gain interest.

However, when a new friend in their elitist circle, Richard Martin, joins the circle, the villagers start to talk as they now this name. Richard has a rival yacht, Moonraker. He says if Allana wins the race he will place an order with the boatyard.

David's sister Joan is romanced by Johnny and becomes part of the crew, but during the race she falls overboard and they lose the race stopping to rescue her. Richard wins the race but is chastised for not stopping to help.

Cast
Edwin Richfield as David King
Don Sharp as Johnny Craig
Gwynneth Vaughan as Joan King
Terry Everitt as Brian King
Eva Rowland as Mrs. King
Roger Maxwell as Mr. Simmonds
John Powe as Barney
Darcy Conyers as Richard Martin
Rigby Foster as Len

Production
The film was an idea of Australians Don Sharp and Frank Worth who met in England. Sharp was appearing in a play with Conyers (and Richfield) called Cage Me a Peacock. They were inspired by low budget films being made in Italy on location, which saved money by not using sets or stars. They decided to find a location and write a script around it. Conyers had an old sailing cutter at Pin Mill and suggested that as a location.

Sharp and Worth wrote the story together over a three-month period. They formed their own production company with Conyers and succeeded in raising finance with William Freshman attached as executive producer. The bulk of the money came from and George N. Gregory who sold his Leeds auction business to help finance. Filming took place in October 1949.

Associated British Pathe offered to distribute on the understanding that everyone would be paid ten pounds a week. A Leeds auctioneer chipped in a few thousand pounds and the filmmakers provided money themselves. When Associated British saw the film they covered the cost of the movie.

The film was shot in Pin Mill, a small fishing village on the River Orwell in Suffolk.  Some scenes were shot in the Butt and Oyster inn.

Reception
The critic from The Scotsman said the film had "too much of the naivete and the emotion of the amateur shine through... often the dialogue is trite and for most of the film the tempo is depressingly perambulatory" but praised the "camera's mobility and many a good character sketch by" the actors. "Has both charm and talent" said the Sunday Times.

References

External links

Ha'penny Breeze at BFI

1950 films
British drama films
1950 drama films
British black-and-white films
1950s English-language films
1950s British films